Milo of Nanteuil ( or ) was a French cleric and crusader. He served as the provost of the cathedral of Reims from 1207 to 1217 and then as bishop Beauvais from 1218 until his death in September 1234.

Milo was the fourth son of Gaucher I, lord of Nanteuil-la-Fosse of the House of Châtillon.  He combined an ambitious pursuit of ecclesiastical office with military service, the building of Beauvais Cathedral and the patronage of Jean Renart.

Milo was a repeat crusader. As a youth, he accompanied King Philip Augustus on the Third Crusade (1190) and was captured. He also took part in the Fifth Crusade (1217–1221), where he was captured at the Battle of Fariskur on 29 August 1219. He was consecrated bishop by Pope Honorius III upon his return in 1222. He accompanied Louis VIII on the Albigensian Crusade (1226) and was with the king at his deathbed. In 1229, with Bishop Hugh of Clermont, Milo brought French troops to Italy at the request of Pope Gregory IX to fight against Frederick II, Holy Roman Emperor, in the so-called War of the Keys. Milo's last years were marred by a conflict in Beauvais between the burgers, the bishop and the king, Louis IX. He opposed royal intervention, but died before the conflict was resolved.

References

Bishops of Beauvais
13th-century French Roman Catholic bishops
1234 deaths
Christians of the Fifth Crusade
13th-century peers of France